Azerbaijan University (AU) is a private university located in Baku, Azerbaijan.

Campuses
Azerbaijan University owns one campuses in the city of Baku.

 I Corp – address: Baku city, Ceyhun Hacıbeyli 71, Bakı 1107

Symbols and logos

Background information

Founded in 1991 by Prof. Salahaddin Khalilov, AU became the first private university in Azerbaijan. It was officially registered by the decision of Higher State Expert Committee on March 3, 1993, and of the Board of Ministry of Education on April 8, 1993, and was registered in the State Register № 1. It was officially registered as non-public Azerbaijan University including a specialized college and English-language gymnasium. On February 24, 2009, AU was re-accredited as higher educational institution with the order number 213 of the Accreditation Commission of the Ministry of Education. The university received the right to award its students diplomas for degrees and majors determined in this order and to use all privileges for public higher educational institutions including the privilege of deferment of military service.

Academic information
The university has 1,099 students in 19 majors. It has about 211 faculty members in six scholar chairs.

The teaching process at the university is carried out in three languages (Azerbaijan, Russian and English). The students of the BBA program learn the second foreign language beside English (German, French, Arabic, Turkish and others), according to their preferences.

Notable alumni

References

External links 
 Azerbaijan University website

Universities in Baku
Private universities and colleges
Educational institutions established in 1991
1991 establishments in Azerbaijan